Anne Turner may refer to:
 Anne Turner (murderer) (1576–1615), English maidservant convicted of the murder of Sir Thomas Overbury
 Anne Milton (born Anne Turner, 1955), British politician, MP and minister
 Anne Turner allotments and playing fields, UK, home of the Cricket Club of North Ferriby
 Anne Turner, a fictional character in Sheena Porter's 1964 novel Nordy Bank

See also
 Ann Turner (disambiguation)
 Anna Turner (disambiguation)